2008–09 in Kenyan football may refer to:
 2008 in Kenyan football
 2009 in Kenyan football